David L. Niezgodski is a Democratic member of the Indiana Senate from the 10th district since 2016. He previously served in the Indiana House of Representatives, representing the 7th District from 2006 to 2016.

Personal life
Niezgodski is married to Shiela Niezgodski. In 2019, Sheila Niezgodski was elected as a Democrat to South Bend's Common Council, representing the 6th District.

References

External links
State Representative David L. Niezgodski official Indiana State Legislature site
 

Democratic Party members of the Indiana House of Representatives
Democratic Party Indiana state senators
Living people
Politicians from South Bend, Indiana
21st-century American politicians
1960 births